Paul John (born 25 January 1970 in Pontypridd) is a former Wales international rugby union player with 10 caps. He is the son of Dennis John, former Wales head coach.

Playing career 
A scrum-half, he played his club rugby for Cardiff RFC, and then Pontypridd RFC, where he was captain.
John started playing for Llantwit Fardre Cardiff from 1986/87 -1990/91. He won 10 Welsh caps, making his debut against Tonga in 1994. He retired as a player in 2005.

Coaching career
He was, until 2010, head coach at Pontypridd. He was assistant coach of the club, as well as a successful Head Coach of the Wales Sevens team, who won the 2009 Rugby World Cup Sevens. John was appointed backs coach for Cardiff Blues in January 2014.

Paul was a teacher of physical education (PE) at Bryn Celynnog Comprehensive School in Beddau, and Coedylan Comprehensive School in Cilfynydd before becoming a full-time coach within the Wales Rugby Union National Academy.

He is now coaching the Hong Kong Sevens Team. In 2018 Asian Games, Hong Kong won all the games in the competition including upset victory over long time rival Japan with scoreline 14–0. Hong Kong became the first gold medal winners in the Asian Games Rugby Sevens under his guidance.

References

1970 births
Living people
Welsh rugby union coaches
Welsh rugby union players
Wales international rugby union players
Wales rugby union captains
Pontypridd RFC players
Rugby union players from Pontypridd